This is an overview of notable viewers for files, that are produced by Computer aided design (CAD), Computer-aided manufacturing (CAM) and Computer-aided engineering (CAE) applications.

Comparison of notable CAD/CAM/CAE file viewers

See also 
 Comparison of computer-aided design software
 List of CAD file formats

References 

Computer-aided engineering
Computer-aided manufacturing
Computer-aided design
CAD, CAM and CAE file viewers